Joshua Obaje is a Nigerian professional footballer, who is currently playing for the Nigeria professional Football Club, Plateau United F.C.

International career
In January 2014, coach Stephen Keshi invited him to be included in the Nigeria national football team for the 2014 African Nations Championship. He helped the team defeat Zimbabwe to a third-place finish, 1–0.

References

Algerian Ligue Professionnelle 1 players
ASO Chlef players
Expatriate footballers in Algeria
Living people
Nigeria A' international footballers
2014 African Nations Championship players
Nigerian footballers
Nigerian expatriate footballers
Nigerian expatriate sportspeople in Algeria
1990 births
Expatriate soccer players in South Africa
Nigerian expatriate sportspeople in South Africa
Black Leopards F.C. players
Heartland F.C. players
Warri Wolves F.C. players
Association football forwards